Quantum Man: Richard Feynman's Life in Science is the eighth non-fiction book by the American theoretical physicist Lawrence M. Krauss. The text was initially published on March 21, 2011 by W. W. Norton & Company.  Physics World chose the book as Book of the Year 2011. In this book, Krauss concentrates on the scientific biography of the physicist Richard Feynman.

Review

—The Guardian

References

External links

Google books

Popular physics books
2011 non-fiction books
Books by Lawrence M. Krauss
Biographies (books)
Richard Feynman
W. W. Norton & Company books